Agani Murutsxi (lit. "New Star") is a monthly newspaper published in Laz language. Newspaper was launched in Turkey, on September 11, 2013, in order to save the Laz language from extinction, it covers monthly culture, sports and political news as well as articles and cartoons on topics like assimilation. Its name is a salute to the world’s first newspaper in the Laz language, "Mç’ita Murutsxi" (Red Star), published in Abkhazia, Georgian SSR in 1929 by İskender Chitaşi. Agani Murutsxi has an average circulation of 1,000 printed newspapers distributed in Laz populated area (Rize and Artvin Provinces) and the cities of western part of Turkey, where Laz population is concentrated, such as: Istanbul, İzmir, Ankara, Bursa, Sakarya, Kocaeli and Düzce.

References

2013 establishments in Turkey
 
Newspapers published in Istanbul
Newspapers established in 2013
Turkish-language newspapers